ASBMB may refer to:
 American Society for Biochemistry and Molecular Biology
 Australian Society for Biochemistry and Molecular Biology